Narragansett is a town in Washington County, Rhode Island, United States. The population was 14,532 at the 2020 census. However, during the summer months the town's population more than doubles to near 34,000. The town of Narragansett occupies a narrow strip of land running along the eastern bank of the Pettaquamscutt River (aka Narrow River) to the shore of Narragansett Bay. It was separated from South Kingstown in 1888 and incorporated as a town in 1901.

For geographic and demographic information on the village of Narragansett Pier, which is part of Narragansett, see the article on Narragansett Pier.

Geography

The following villages and neighborhoods are wholly or partially located in Narragansett: Saunderstown (shared with North Kingstown), South Ferry, Bonnet Shores, Narragansett Pier, Point Judith, Galilee, Great Island, Salt Pond, Mettatuxet, and Jerusalem (shared with South Kingstown).

Climate

Demographics

As of the census of 2000, there were 16,361 people, 6,846 households, and 3,847 families residing in the town. The racial makeup of the town was 95.84% White, 0.75% African American, 0.90% Native American, 0.76% Asian, 0.02% Pacific Islander, 0.34% from other races, and 1.40% from two or more races. Hispanic or Latino of any race were 1.25% of the population.

There were 6,846 households, out of which 22.0% had children under the age of 18 living with them, 44.6% were married couples living together, 8.7% had a female householder with no husband present, and 43.8% were non-families. Of all households 27.2% were made up of individuals, and 9.0% had someone living alone who was 65 years of age or older. The average household size was 2.38 and the average family size was 2.86.

In the town, the population was spread out, with 17.3% under the age of 18, 19.6% from 18 to 24, 25.0% from 25 to 44, 24.6% from 45 to 64, and 13.5% who were 65 years of age or older. The median age was 36 years. For every 100 females, there were 94.5 males. For every 100 females age 18 and over, there were 92.4 males.

The median income for a household in the town was $50,363, and the median income for a family was $67,571. Males had a median income of $45,436 versus $31,759 for females. The per capita income for the town was $28,194. About 4.9% of families and 16.0% of the population were below the poverty line, including 8.4% of those under age 18 and 5.0% of those age 65 or over. In 2010, Narragansett was estimated to have 2,743 people in poverty; college students represented 71% of that group, and in comparison, statewide college students make up only 13.7 percent of the total population in poverty. This large college factor, in a relatively small community, has a profound impact on the overall poverty rate.

From September through May the town is home to many students from the University of Rhode Island located in nearby Kingston.

Recreation 

Narragansett is known for its summer recreation and beaches. Fishermen's Memorial State Park, located near Galilee, contains a former military fort (Fort Greene) and a campground.

Three beaches in Narragansett that are most famous are:

 Narragansett Town Beach is located in the center of Narragansett, though it charges a fee—whereas other local (state funded) beaches charge for parking only. Unlike state-funded beaches, it is self-sustaining and is not supported by the tax payers' money. There is a $10.00 charge to park ($15.00 on the weekends/holidays) and a daily $10.00 admission fee to enter onto the beach.
 Scarborough State Beach: The Scarborough Beach Complex comprises two separate areas, the North and South. Each has a pavilion, showers, 75 picnic tables, boardwalk and observation tower. There is a small fee for parking if a spot on nearby streets can not be found. Parking on nearby streets can result in vehicles being towed (especially during the summer months). This beach sits next to a local sewage treatment plant.
 Roger Wheeler State Beach and Salty Brine State Beach are both located in Point Judith, which is the southernmost point of Narragansett. Both beaches are protected by the breakwater that protects the port of Galilee. A new pavilion at Salty Brine State Beach opened in the summer of 2010, complete with concessions, and a wind turbine. The wind turbine was destroyed after a storm in March 2017.

Education

Narragansett operates its own Pre-K through 12 educational system with three schools: Narragansett Elementary School, Narragansett Pier Middle School, and Narragansett High School. The Narragansett High School principal, Mr. Daniel F. Warner, was voted the 2008 Principal of the Year. The South County Museum is located within the town. The Narragansett Bay Campus of the University of Rhode Island is located in Narragansett.

Housing
Narragansett has prohibited more than three college students from living together per housing unit.

Water Supply

The town is served by two drinking water organizations divided into four systems:
 The Town of Narragansett Water Division – which purchases its water from external sources:
 North End Suez – which purchases its water from Suez Water, a private company in South Kingstown with wells drawing from the Mink Brook Aquifer
 North End North Kingston – which purchases its water from Town of North Kingstown which has wells drawing from the Hunt Annaquatucket-Pettaquamscutt (HAP) aquifer system
 Point Judith – which purchases its water from Suez Water
 Suez Water also has direct retail customers in Narragansett.

Economy

Top employers
According to Narragansett's 2012 Comprehensive Annual Financial Report, the top employers in the city are:

Places of worship 
 St. Thomas More Church (Roman Catholic)
 St. Veronica Chapel (Roman Catholic)
 St. Mary Star of the Sea Church (Roman Catholic)
 St. Peter By-the-Sea Church (Episcopal)
 Calvary Bible Church (Nondenominational)
 First Baptist Church of Narragansett
 South Ferry Church (Baptist, no regular services)
 Church of Jesus Christ of Latter-day Saints, Narragansett Ward
 Generation Church (nondenominational)
 Congregation Beth David (Jewish conservative)

National Register of Historic Places

Thirteen different buildings and districts in Narragansett are listed on the National Register of Historic Places:

Central Street Historic District
The Dunes Club (1928)
Druidsdream (1884)
Dunmere (1883)
Earlscourt Historic District
Gardencourt (1888)
Gladstone Springhouse and Bottling Plant (1899)
Greene Inn (1887)
Narragansett Baptist Church (1850)
Narragansett Pier Life Saving Station (1888)
Ocean Road Historic District
Point Judith Lighthouse (1857)
Towers Historic District
The Towers (1883)

Notable people

 Karen Adams, television news anchor
 Andy Boss, auto racing driver
 Geoff Boss, auto racing driver
 Peter Boss, auto racing driver
 John Joseph Boylan, Roman Catholic bishop; died in Narragansett
 Ruth Clifford, silent film actress; lived in Narragasnett
 David Caprio, attorney and former state representative
 Frank Caprio, judge and television personality
 Frank T. Caprio, former state treasurer
 Alana DiMario, member of the Rhode Island Senate
 Patrick Doyle, Domino’s Pizza CEO
 Roberta Dunbar, clubwoman, born Narragansett Pier
 Joe Faragalli, football player and coach; died in Narragansett
 Steven Fulop, current mayor of Jersey City, New Jersey
 John Gardner, farmer and Rhode Island delegate to the Continental Congress (1789)
 Harriet Lane, acting first lady of the United States for her uncle James Buchanan
 Donald Lally, former state representative
 Ted Leo, indie rock musician; lives in Narragansett
 J. Howard McGrath, former United States attorney general (1949–1952) and governor of Rhode Island (1941–1945); died in Narragansett
 Christopher Murney, actor
 Peter Pezzelli, novelist
 William Russell Sweet, painter and sculptor
 Tage Thompson, NHL Hockey player
 Jack Zilly, football player; died in Narragansett

In popular culture
 Narragansett is mentioned in Chapter LI of Theodore Dreiser's The Titan.
 Several episodes in the television cartoon show Family Guy, which takes place in Rhode Island, feature the Narragansett Beach, most notably A Fish out of Water.
 In the 1973 movie The Sting, the Narragansett horse race track is one of those mentioned in the background while performing the con for the mob boss Doyle Lonnegan (Robert Shaw); this track, while well known in the period, was actually in Pawtucket, RI.
 In the 1993 movie Coneheads, Prymatt Conehead, portrayed by Jane Curtin, receives a fake ID where it is mentioned she was born in Narragansett, RI.
 Several scenes from the 2000 movie Me, Myself & Irene, starring Jim Carrey, were filmed in the Great Island area of Narragansett.

See also

References

External links

 Town of Narragansett official website

 
Narragansett Bay
Populated coastal places in Rhode Island
Providence metropolitan area
Towns in Rhode Island
Towns in Washington County, Rhode Island